Delyankir is a rural locality (a selo) under the administrative jurisdiction of the Settlement of Artyk in Oymyakonsky District of the Sakha Republic, Russia, located  from Artyk on the Kolyma Highway on the border with Magadan Oblast. Its population as of the 2010 Census was three people, down from four recorded during the 2002 Census.

Climate
Delyankir has an extreme subarctic climate (Köppen climate classification Dwd) with very short and mild to cool summers, followed by very long, dry, and extremely cold winters. Although summers are very mild on average, sometimes it can be surprisingly hot, especially for a place with such northerly latitude. The highest recorded temperature in July was 35.1°C. It is one of the coldest places in the northern hemisphere and the world, alongside Oymyakon and Verkhoyansk. On the night of December 8-9, 2021, the temperature went down to -61.1ºС, making it the coldest temperature recorded in December.

Delyankir is also one of the rare places in the world with a temperature amplitude higher than 100 °C (180 °F).

References

Notes

Sources
Official website of the Sakha Republic. Registry of the Administrative-Territorial Divisions of the Sakha Republic. Oymyakonsky District. 

Rural localities in Oymyakonsky District